Şasenem Sanctuary is a sanctuary (zakaznik) of Turkmenistan.

It is part of Gaplaňgyr Nature Reserve. It was established for the breeding and settling of kulans, Equus hemionus kulan, a subspecies of onager, the Asian wild ass.

External links
 http://www.natureprotection.gov.tm/reserve_tm.html

Sanctuaries in Turkmenistan